Mangelia caelata is a species of sea snail, a marine gastropod mollusk in the family Mangeliidae.

Description
The length of the shell attains 6.5 mm.

Distribution
This species was found in the Pacific Ocean off Nicaragua.

References

External links
 

caelata
Gastropods described in 1843